Joris Teepe is a Dutch jazz bassist, composer, arranger, and big-band leader. He plays contemporary jazz, bebop, and free jazz.

Biography

Teepe studied at the Conservatory of Amsterdam. In 1992 the left-handed bassist moved to New York City, where he recorded his first album as a leader in 1993, with the American tenor saxophone player Don Braden as co-leader, with sidemen trumpeter Tom Harrell, pianist, Cyrus Chestnut and Carl Allen on drums. A second album of a very similar group was released in 1996. After this he played and recorded with several groups: a trio (the Intercontinental Jazz Trio, with Shingo Okudaira and Tim Armacost) and groups that almost always included Don Braden. Additionally Randy Brecker and Chris Potter were playing in his bands.

In the past years he started working with larger (big)-bands: the Groningen Art Ensemble (with in addition to Braden included among others Brian Lynch and trombonist Conrad Herwig) and the Joris Teepe Big Band. Many songs he plays and records are original compositions, but he also arranges other people's material. He arranged the music of Duke Ellington, Billy Strayhorn and John Coltrane. In recent years he has also written for larger ensembles and even symphonic orchestras.

Teepe is also actively working as a sideman, arranger, and producer for other musicians. He collaborated with among others Joey Berkley, Ron Jackson, Darrell Grant, Antonio Ciacca, Mathilde Santing, Deborah Brown, Fay Claassen and was a long time member of the Rashied Ali Band. Furthermore, Teepe is active in jazz-education: he is head of the jazz department at the Prins Claus Conservatory in Groningen and teaches bass at the New Jersey Performing Arts Center.

Teepe has been a resident of Teaneck, New Jersey.

Discography

As leader
 Pay as You Earn (Mons, 1994)
 Bottom Line (Mons, 1996)
 Live at the Bimhuis (Via, 1997)
 Seven Days a Week (Via, 1998)
 Firm Roots (Via, 1999)
 For Adults Only (Postcards, 2000)
 Jazz in Jazz Out (Planet Arts, 2003)
 Going Dutch (Twinz, 2004)
 We Take No Prisoners (Challenge, 2009)
 Conversations (Creative Perspective, 2016)
 In the Spirit of Rashied Ali (Jazz Tribes, 2018)
 In the Spirit of Herbie Hancock with Don Braden (OAP, 2020)

As sideman
 Rashied Ali, Judgment Day (Survival, 2006)
 Rashied Ali, Live in Europe (Survival, 2009)
 Rashied Ali, Live at the Zinc Bar (Jazz Intensity, 2012)
 Don Braden, Landing Zone (Landmark, 1995)
 Don Braden, Gentle Storm (HighNote, 2008)
 Antonio Ciacca, Autumn in New York (Splasc(h), 2002)
 Lewis Porter, Trio Solo (Unseen Rain, 2013)
 Jeanfrançois Prins, El Gaucho Challenge, 2012

Notes
Muziek Encyclopedie - Joris Teepe page

References

External links
Official website

Dutch jazz musicians
Living people
Year of birth missing (living people)
Musicians from The Hague
People from Teaneck, New Jersey